Kutti Pisasu in Tamil, Bombat Car in Kannada and Cara Majaka in Telugu is a 2010 Indian multilingual fantasy film written and directed by Rama Narayanan, who returns after an eight year sabbatical. The film stars Baby Geethika, Ramji, Rajiv Kanakala, Silli Lalli Ravishankar, Sangeetha, and Ramya Krishnan, while Riyaz Khan, Shafi, Ganja Karuppu, and Nassar play supporting roles. Each version has a slightly different supporting cast. The Tamil version was dubbed in Hindi as Magic Robot and in Bengali as Robot - The Magic Car.

Plot
The film opens with Kinathadi Kaali (Ramya Krishnan) establishing her powers with a couple of sequences, including reducing a screen scorcher (Nassar) to a pale shadow. Cut to the present, where Priya (Geethika) is the intelligent daughter of Pichumani (Ramji) and Gayathri (Sangeetha), who treat her like the apple of their eyes. Soon, she is possessed by the spirit of Savithri (Kaveri), who was ditched by her fiancé Nanjappan (Riyaz Khan). With the help of Kaali, it is the now the turn of Savithri and her brother Karuppu (Ganja Karuppu) to take revenge. How they punish Nanjappan and his sorcerer friend Mandiramoorthy (Shafi) is the rest of the story.

Cast 

Tamil version
 Ramji as Pichumani
 Ramya Krishnan as Kinathadi Kaali
 Ganja Karuppu as Karuppu
 Dhandapani as Kudu Kuduppu Kullamuni
 Delhi Ganesh
Telugu version
Rajiv Kanakala
Ali
L. B. Sriram
Kannada version
 Ramya Krishna as Kendaganna Kaali
Ravishankar Gowda
Sharan
Doddanna
Bank Janardhan

Production 
Geetika was cast in this film after winning season 5 of the Telugu-language dance show Aata Juniors. She was credited in Kannada as Kruthika. A Morris Minor car that turns into a giant named "Car Man" is the film's antagonist. The car that featured in the film was made specially for the movie. Actress Sangeetha was cast as one of the leads.

Soundtrack 
Soundtrack was composed by Deva.
 Tamil Tracklist

 Telugu Tracklist

 Kannada Tracklist

Critical reception
Tamil version
Sify wrote "The special effects and graphics are just ok; otherwise there is nothing in the film. Ramanarayanan has tried to mix witchcraft, sorcery, crass comedy with modern graphics borrowed from films like ?The Transformer? and ?The Car?. It is meant strictly for the consumption of interior Tamil Nadu audiences." The Times of India wrote "This is strictly for the masses, and although may turn out to be cotton candy for mothers and kids, you can't help feeling that Rama Narayanan has been away from direction for too long. It shows." Rediff wrote "Story-wise, there's no great variation from predecessors like all the Amma movies but this one comes with an interesting ghost-twist. On the flip side, the production values are tacky, the acting juvenile and the screenplay downright silly." The Hindu wrote "There's little to say in terms of story or production value. Strange, considering director Rama. Narayanan is a veteran in children's and godly movies, even if they are terribly over-the-top!".

Kannada version
Deccan Herald opined that "With most films boasting of superior, state-of-art technology, "Bombat Car" looks like a pathetic attempt to win back the traditional audience of such films - women and small children. However, with able support from the graphics and special effects guys, the effect is tolerable - the handsome robot dancing in tandem with the prancing kid, not at all conveying menace. Bangalore Mirror wrote that Rama Narayanan "manages to keep the film interesting. There is no logic to what transpires, but it is fun to watch. And it won't be just kids who will find it enjoyable. Indiaglitz wrote "Quite often the tricks in this flick and Baby Kirthika stunning performance are sure to attract the attention. The technology usage despite of inspiration from the Hindi film "Tarzan the Wonder Car", Hollywood's "Transformers", "Anaconda" etc Rama Narayanan has given a convincing film that is a Paisa Vasool. The robot that his technical team arrived at is another redeeming feature of this film."

References

External links 
 
 

2010 films
2010s Tamil-language films
2010s Telugu-language films
2010s Kannada-language films
Films directed by Rama Narayanan
Films scored by Deva (composer)
Indian multilingual films
Indian children's fantasy films
Indian films about revenge
2010s children's fantasy films
2010 multilingual films